Hani Qadri Demian is an Egyptian civil servant who served as the Egypt's minister of finance to which he was first appointed in February 2014. The cabinet was led by Prime Minister Ibrahim Mahlab. Before serving in the post Demian was working at the finance ministry as the assistant to the minister. His term ended in 2016.

References

External links

21st-century Egyptian politicians
Living people
Finance Ministers of Egypt
Year of birth missing (living people)